Stone Gon'  is the second studio album by American R&B singer Barry White, released in 1973 on the 20th Century label. The album was arranged by Barry White and Gene Page.

History
The album topped the R&B albums chart, his second to do so. It also reached #20 on the Billboard 200 and #18 on the UK Albums Chart. The album was a success, yielding two Billboard R&B Top Ten singles, "Never, Never Gonna Give Ya Up" and "Honey Please, Can't Ya See". Both were also successful on the Billboard Hot 100, peaking at #7 and #44 respectively. "Never, Never Gonna Give Ya Up" was also a hit on the UK Singles Chart, peaking at #14. The album was digitally remastered and reissued on CD on May 3, 1994, by Island/Mercury Records.

Track listing

Personnel
Barry White - lead vocals, arranger
Gene Page - arranger
Technical
Frank Kejmar - engineer
Craig Braun - design
Norman Seeff - photography

Charts

Certifications and sales

See also
List of number-one R&B albums of 1974 (U.S.)

References

External links
 Stone Gon' at Discogs

1973 albums
Barry White albums
Albums arranged by Gene Page
20th Century Fox Records albums